Judith of Hungary (b. Esztergom, ca. 969 - d. Kraków?, ca. 988) was a Hungarian princess and member of the House of Arpad. She was briefly married to the Piast duke of Poland, Bolesław the Brave.

According to some sources, she was the eldest child of Géza of Hungary by his first wife Sarolt, a daughter of Gyula of Transylvania.

However, modern historians have now discarded her parentage, and state that she was an unknown Hungarian princess. Though opinions vary about the identity of Bolesław I's second wife, there are a number of researchers who still support the hypothesis of her being the daughter of Géza.

Life 

At the end of 985, Judith became in the second wife of Bolesław, heir of the Polish throne, after he repudiated his first wife Hunilda, daughter of Rikdag, Margrave of Meissen. The union (probably instigated by Duke Boleslav II of Bohemia, maternal uncle of the Polish prince) produced a son, Bezprym.

Perhaps because of the deterioration in political relations between Poland and Hungary, around 987 Judith was repudiated and sent away. She probably remained in Poland and died shortly after her divorce; she never became Duchess of Poland because her father-in-law was still alive at the time of her dismissal.

Bolesław soon re-married, this time with Emnilda, a Slavic princess, who bore him five children, including the future Mieszko II Lambert. Despite Bezprym being the first-born son, he was deprived of the throne of Poland by his father, who largely favored the children born from his union with Emnilda. Around 1003 Bolesław I sent Bezprym to Italy, where he became a monk in one of Saint Romuald's hermitages. In 1031, in alliance with Conrad II, Holy Roman Emperor and the Grand Prince Yaroslav I the Wise, he finally gained the throne to his half-brother Mieszko II. His reign didn't last long and was murdered one year later.

Judith was survived by her father, and when he died in 997, one of his distant cousins Koppány, declared his claim to the leadership of the Magyars against Judith's brother, Vajk. Koppány wanted to marry Judith's stepmother, referring to the Hungarian tradition. Koppány, nevertheless, was defeated, and shortly afterwards Vajk was crowned as the first King of Hungary as Stephen I.

See also 
 History of Poland (966–1385)

References 

10th-century Hungarian women
10th-century Polish women
10th-century Hungarian people
10th-century Polish people
Polish people of Hungarian descent
House of Árpád
960s births
980s deaths
Year of birth uncertain
Year of death uncertain
People from Esztergom